Adelotypa is a genus of butterflies in the family Riodinidae. They are found in South America.

The type species of the genus is Adelotypa xanthobrunnea Warren, 1895, which was mistakenly described as a Geometridae species.

Species
Listed alphabetically:

Adelotypa annulifera (Godman, 1903) – cherry-spot
Adelotypa argiella (Bates, 1868) Brazil
Adelotypa asemna (Stichel, 1910) Bolivia, Brazil
Adelotypa bolena (Butler, 1867)  Brazil, Paraguay
Adelotypa borsippa (Hewitson, 1863) Brazil
Adelotypa curulis (Hewitson, 1874) Ecuador, Bolivia
Adelotypa densemaculata (Hewitson, 1870) Panama, Nicaragua, Colombia, Ecuador, Peru
Adelotypa eudocia (Godman & Salvin, 1897) Mexico, Costa Rica
Adelotypa glauca (Godman & Salvin, [1886]) Costa Rica, Venezuela
Adelotypa malca (Schaus, 1902) Brazil
Adelotypa mollis (Butler, 1877) Brazil
Adelotypa penthea (Cramer, [1777]) French Guiana, Guyana, Suriname, Brazil, Peru
Adelotypa sejuncta (Stichel, 1910) Brazil
Adelotypa tinea (Bates, 1868) Brazil
Adelotypa trinitatis (Lathy, 1932)  Ecuador, Trinidad and Tobago
Adelotypa zerna (Hewitson, 1872) Bolivia, Brazil

References

External links

Adelotypa, Butterflies of America
Adelotypa, Tree of Life

Nymphidiini
Riodinidae of South America
Butterfly genera
Taxa named by William Warren (entomologist)